The Ol-class tankers were Royal Fleet Auxiliary Replenishment oilers built from 1917-1919 tasked with providing fuel and other supplies to Royal Navy vessels around the world. There were six ships in the class. Until 1936 they were managed by Davies and Newman with RFA crews, after which time they were transferred to the Admiralty.

The lead ship of the class RFA Olcades was originally built as British Beacon and acquired for RFA use in 1918. She was renamed in 1936.

The six ships in the Ol-class saw wide service during World War II as far afield as India, Singapore and the Far East.

Construction programme

References

 Ol-Class Fleet Replenishment Tankers

Auxiliary replenishment ship classes
 Ol